Vernon Joseph Biever (May 21, 1923 – October 13, 2010) was an American photographer, most notably with the Green Bay Packers.

Biever covered his first Packers game in 1941 for The Milwaukee Sentinel while a student at St. Norbert College. He served in the United States Army during World War II. Later, he owned a Ben Franklin store and a travel agency in Port Washington, Wisconsin. He was the official team photographer from 1946 until his retirement in 2006.

His photographs were collected in The Glory of Titletown. Biever's photographs have been featured in books, television shows, and movies.

Biever's son John is a photographer for Sports Illustrated. His other son, James, and grandson, Michael, also were photographers for the Packers.

References

 "Sterling Sharpe & Vernon Biever Headed to Packer Hall of Fame" 21 May 2002
 "He's Always Been in the Picture for Packers", Milwaukee Journal Sentinel 23 May 2002

External links
 Packers.com team staff list
 "Vernon J. Biever Classic Collection" - official gallery
 

1923 births
2010 deaths
American photographers
United States Army personnel of World War II
Military personnel from Wisconsin
People from Port Washington, Wisconsin
St. Norbert College alumni
Businesspeople from Wisconsin
Green Bay Packers personnel
20th-century American businesspeople